Alessandro Barbero (born 30 April 1959) is an Italian historian, novelist and essayist.

Barbero was born in Turin.  He attended the University of Turin, where he studied literature and Medieval history. He won the 1996 Strega Prize, Italy's most distinguished literary award, for Bella vita e guerre altrui di Mr. Pyle gentiluomo. His second novel, Romanzo russo. Fiutando i futuri supplizi, has been translated into English as The Anonymous Novel. Sensing the Future Torments (Sulaisiadar 'san Rudha: Vagabond Voices, 2010).

Franco Cardini wrote in Il Giornale, "Barbero uses the diabolic skills of an erudite and professional narrator to seek out massacres of the distant and recent past. The Anonymous Novel concerns the past-that-never-passes (whether Tsarist or Stalinist) and the future that in 1988 was impending and has now arrived". Allan Massie wrote in The Scotsman, ""If you have any feeling for Russia or for the art of the novel, then read this one. You will find it an enriching experience," and Eric Hobsbawm wrote in The Observer, "The Anonymous Novel: Sensing the Future Torments, from a new publisher, Vagabond Voices, situated on the Isle of Lewis, is a vivid novel about Russians coping with the transition from communism to capitalism and combines echoes of Bulgakov with elements of a thriller."

Barbero is the author of The Battle, an account of the Battle of Waterloo, which has been translated into English. Other histories he has written which have been translated into English include The Day of the Barbarians, the story of the Battle of Adrianople, and Charlemagne: Father of a Continent.

Barbero is also a commentator and organiser on the Italian cultural scene: he is currently a member of the Management Committee of the Premio Strega and the Editorial Committee of the magazine Storica; he writes for the literary and cultural pages of Il Sole 24 Ore and La Stampa, and regularly appears on the television programme Superquark and radio programme Alle otto della sera. He is the editor of Storia d'Europa e del Mediterraneo, which is published by Salerno Editore.

In 2005, the Republic of France awarded Barbero with the title of "Chevalier de l'ordre des Arts et des Lettres". In the late 2010s, he acquired a remarkable popularity on Internet thanks to his many conferences uploaded on YouTube, lessons with hundreds of thousands views.

Works

Essays 
 
  - Collana Storia e Società, Roma-Bari, Laterza, 2021, ISBN 978-88-581-4527-2.
 
 
 
 Un'oligarchia urbana. Politica ed economia a Torino fra Tre e Quattrocento, Roma, Viella, 1995, ISBN 88-85669-37-9.
 La cavalleria medievale, Roma, Jouvence, 1999, ISBN 88-7801-306-4.
 Medioevo. Storia di voci, racconto di immagini, with Chiara Frugoni, Roma-Bari, Laterza, 1999, ISBN 88-420-5850-5.
 Carlo Magno. Un padre dell'Europa, Collana Storia e Società, Roma-Bari, Laterza, 2000, ISBN 88-420-6054-2.
 Valle d'Aosta medievale, Napoli, Liguori Editore, 2000, ISBN 88-207-3162-2.
 Benedette iene, in Francesco Antonioli (a cura di), La Bibbia dei non credenti. Protagonisti della vita italiana sfidano il Libro dei libri, Casale Monferrato, Piemme, 2002, pp. 124-127, ISBN 88-384-6504-5.
 Il ducato di Savoia. Amministrazione e corte di uno stato franco-italiano, 1416-1536, Collana Quadrante, Roma-Bari, Laterza, 2002, ISBN 88-420-6708-3.
 La guerra in Europa dal Rinascimento a Napoleone, Roma, Carocci, 2003, ISBN 88-430-2697-6.
 La battaglia. Storia di Waterloo, Collana I Robinson. Letture, Roma-Bari, Laterza, 2003, ISBN 88-420-6979-5. [tradotto in 6 lingue]
 Bonifacio VIII e la casa di Francia, in Bonifacio VIII. Atti del XXXIX Convegno storico internazionale. Todi, 13-16 ottobre 2002, Spoleto, Fondazione Centro italiano di studi sull'alto Medioevo, 2003, ISBN 88-7988-406-9.
 9 agosto 378. Il giorno dei barbari, Collana I Robinson. Letture, Roma-Bari, Laterza, 2005, ISBN 88-420-7765-8.
 Barbari. Immigrati, profughi, deportati nell'impero romano, Collana Storia e Società, Roma-Bari, Laterza, 2006, ISBN 88-420-8082-9.
 Civiltà del tempo, fotografie di Pepi Merisio, Roma, Ecra, 2007, 978-88-6558-026-4.
 Terre d'acqua. I vercellesi all'epoca delle crociate, Roma-Bari, Laterza, 2007, ISBN 978-88-420-8330-6.
 Storia del Piemonte. Dalla preistoria alla globalizzazione, Torino, Einaudi, 2008, ISBN 978-88-06-18594-7.
 Benedette guerre. Crociate e jihad, Collana Saggi Tascabili, Roma-Bari, Laterza, 2009, ISBN 978-88-420-8987-2.
 Lepanto. La battaglia dei tre imperi, Collana I Robinson. Letture, Roma-Bari, Laterza, 2010, ISBN 978-88-420-8893-6.
 Il ronzino del vescovo. Una fonte notarile, Prima lezione di metodo storico, Roma-Bari, Laterza, 2010, ISBN 978-8842092209.
 Il divano di Istanbul, Collana Alle 8 della sera, Palermo, Sellerio, 2011, ISBN 88-389-2538-0.
 29 maggio 1176. Barbarossa sconfitto a Legnano, Roma-Bari, Laterza, 2011, pubblicato in e-book.
 Dietro le quinte della storia. La vita quotidiana attraverso il tempo, con Piero Angela, Milano, Rizzoli, 2012, ISBN 978-88-17-06147-6.
 Capitolo I tre papi di san Francesco, in I volti del potere, Laterza, 2012, ISBN 978-88-420-9980-2.
 I prigionieri dei Savoia. La vera storia della congiura di Fenestrelle, Collana I Robinson. Letture, Roma-Bari, Laterza, 2012, ISBN 978-88-420-9566-8.
 Solimano il Magnifico, Roma-Bari, Laterza, 2012, pubblicato in e-book.
 Straniero. L'invasore, l'esule, l'altro, con Maurizio Bettini, Milano, Encyclomedia, 2012, ISBN 978-88-97514-29-9.
 1289. La battaglia di Campaldino, Roma-Bari, Laterza, 2013, pubblicato in e-book.
 Donne, madonne, mercanti e cavalieri. Sei storie medievali, Collana I Robinson. Letture, Roma-Bari, Laterza, 2013, ISBN 978-88-581-0857-4.
 Costantino il Vincitore, Collezione Biblioteca Storica, Roma, Salerno Editore, 2016, ISBN 978-88-6973-138-9.
 Le parole del papa. Da Gregorio VII a Francesco, Collana I Robinson. Letture, Roma-Bari, Laterza, 2016. ISBN 978-88-581-2577-9.
 Federico il Grande, Collana Alle 8 della sera, Palermo, Sellerio, 2007, ISBN 88-389-2225-X; Collana La memoria, Sellerio, 2017, ISBN 978-88-389-3692-0.

Other Contributions

Narrative 
  - Vincitore del Premio Strega 1996, tradotto in sette lingue.
 
 
 
  - Vincitore del "Premio Alessandro Manzoni - città di Lecco" 2011.

Translations 
  - con uno scritto di A. Barbero, Collana Oscar Classici n.663, Milano, Mondadori, 2012, ISBN 978-88-045-8590-9; Collana La memoria n.1219, Palermo, Sellerio, 2022, ISBN 978-88-389-4269-3.
  - Vercelli, Effedì, 2020, ISBN 978-88-859-5062-7.

References

External links 
 Curriculum vitae

1959 births
Living people
Writers from Turin
20th-century Italian novelists
20th-century male writers
21st-century Italian novelists
Italian essayists
Male essayists
Chevaliers of the Ordre des Arts et des Lettres
Strega Prize winners
Historians of the Napoleonic Wars
Italian male novelists
Italian male non-fiction writers